Grace Dieu and High Sharpley is an 86 hectare biological and geological Site of Special Scientific Interest between Coalville and Shepshed in Leicestershire. Grace Dieu Quarry is a Geological Conservation Review site.

This site is composed of several fragments of the formerly extensive Charnwood Forest, and it has diverse habitats of heath, woodland, rock, scrub and acid grassland. Grace Dieu Quarry exhibits a thin marine Lower Carboniferous layer of Carboniferous Limestone, close to the Midland shoreline around 340 million years ago.

Roads and footpaths go through some areas of the site.

References

Sites of Special Scientific Interest in Leicestershire
Geological Conservation Review sites